Dawid Szufryn (born 29 May 1986) is a Polish professional footballer who plays as a defender for Sandecja Nowy Sącz.

References

External links
 

Living people
1986 births
Sportspeople from Nowy Sącz
Polish footballers
Association football defenders
Ekstraklasa players
Sandecja Nowy Sącz players